Milica Dabović (born 16 February 1982) is a Serbian professional women's basketball player. She represented the Serbian national basketball team.

International career
She is a captain of the Serbia national basketball team. At the 2013 EuroBasket team won 4th place and qualified for the 2014 FIBA World Championship.

She led the team once again at the EuroBasket 2015 in Budapest where they won the gold medal, and qualified for the 2016 Olympics, first in the history for the Serbian team. In 2016, she announced retirement from the professional basketball.

Personal life
Her father is basketball coach Milan Dabović and her mother is Nevenka Dabović, former handball player. Milica has a younger brother Milan, who is an active basketball player, and two sisters, the older Jelica, a former basketball player, and younger Ana, active basketball player. On 20 December 2017 she gave birth to her son Stefan. In late October 2022, Dabović opened an OnlyFans account.

References

External links

Milica Dabović at eurobasket.com
Milica Dabović at fiba.com
Milica Dabović at Milica Dabovic Basketball Camp

1982 births
Living people
Sportspeople from Cetinje
Serbs of Montenegro
Point guards
Serbian women's basketball players
Beşiktaş women's basketball players
ŽKK Partizan players
ŽKK Crvena zvezda players
ŽKK Novi Zagreb players
ŽKK Vojvodina players
Galatasaray S.K. (women's basketball) players
Basketball players at the 2016 Summer Olympics
Olympic basketball players of Serbia
Olympic bronze medalists for Serbia
Montenegrin expatriate basketball people in Serbia
Serbian expatriate basketball people in Croatia
Serbian expatriate basketball people in France
Serbian expatriate basketball people in Italy
Serbian expatriate basketball people in Lithuania
Serbian expatriate basketball people in Montenegro
Serbian expatriate basketball people in Poland
Serbian expatriate basketball people in Russia
Serbian expatriate basketball people in Turkey
Serbian expatriate basketball people in Albania
Serbian expatriate basketball people in Lebanon
Serbian expatriate basketball people in Bosnia and Herzegovina
Medalists at the 2016 Summer Olympics
Olympic medalists in basketball
European champions for Serbia
Al Riyadi Club Beirut basketball players
OnlyFans creators